The Revolution of the 44 was a military rebellion led by a group of Salvadoran generals, known as "the 44", against the government of President General Carlos Ezeta and Vice President General Antonio Ezeta.

The rebellion began in late-April 1894 when rebels captured the western Salvadoran city of Santa Ana, upon which, Ezeta declared a state of siege. By mid-June 1894, the rebels ousted the Ezeta brothers and installed General Rafael Antonio Gutiérrez as the country's provisional president.

Background 

On 22 June 1890, General Carlos Ezeta, with the support of some indigenous Salvadorans, staged a coup d'état which overthrew and killed President General Francisco Menéndez, who himself became president after a coup d'état against Rafael Zaldívar in 1885. The Guatemalan government refused to recognize Ezeta's government and declared war on El Salvador on 27 June 1890. Guatemalan forces under General Cayetano Sánchez and Salvadoran forces under Ezeta's brother, General Antonio Ezeta, met in battle on 21 July outside the city of Coatepeque, ending in a Guatemalan victory. Another battle occurred on 3 August near the town of Tempisque, ending in a Salvadoran victory.

Although Salvadoran exiles supported the Guatemalans in an attempt to seize power, the war ended in September 1890 on the condition that the Salvadoran people are allowed to elect their president. The following year, the Salvadoran government held a presidential election. The election was heavily rigged in Carlos' favor; he was the only candidate and won 52,342 votes to only 19 against, or 99.96 percent. Antonio was elected as his vice president, winning by a similar margin. Their term began on 1 March 1891. Additionally, Antonio was appointed as the commander-in-chief of the army.

Revolution 

On the morning of 29 April 1894, a group of 44 rebels captured the western Salvadoran city of Santa Ana. The rebels, had arrived from exile in Guatemala, captured the city's army barracks and forced Antonio and General Jacinto Colocho, the barrack's commander, to flee the city to Coatepeque. In response to the rebellion, which numbered around 500 rebels and was supported by an additional 5,000 soldiers from Guatemala and Honduras, Carlos invoked articles 4 and 91 of the constitution and declared a state of siege for twenty-nine days. In a public announcement issued through the Diario Oficial newspaper on the day the rebellion began, Carlos stated:

On 1 May, General Rafael Antonio Gutiérrez, one of the rebellion's leaders, was proclaimed as the country's president in opposition to the Ezeta brothers' government. On 3 May, Antonio was wounded by rebel forces, resulting in him being replaced as commander-in-chief of the army by General León Bolaños. On 5 May, while Carlos was traveling to Santa Ana by train in command of an army of 1,000 soldiers, rebels derailed the train near the town of La Ceiba by ripping out the track's rivets on a bridge that crossed the Ateos river. He survived the derailment, as his carriage was specially designed to be stronger than the other carriages. The number of casualties is unknown. The rebels captured the Santa Ana Volcano and entered its crater on 8 May. Government forces under the command of General Joaquín López defeated rebel forces in the city of Chalchuapa on 11 May, forcing them to retreat back to Santa Ana.

Antonio reassumed the role of commander-in-chief on 23 May after recovering from his injuries.

As the rebels made advances towards San Salvador, Carlos fled the country for Panama on 4 June, departing from the port of La Libertad. From there, he left for New York City and then Europe. Upon his brother's flight from the country, Antonio assumed the presidency in an acting capacity and commanded his army to retreat to Santa Tecla on 5 June. By then, his army, which began with 1,700 soldiers, was reduced to a few hundred soldiers due to soldiers being killed, wounded, or deserting. The United States had dispatched the USS Bennington to the port of La Libertad to protect the interests of U.S. citizens in the country, where Antonio and sixteen other generals requested asylum. After both Ezeta brothers had fled the country, Gutiérrez marched into San Salvador on 10 June and officially assumed office as provisional president. The new government requested the extradition of those who fled the country to the United States, but the U.S. government refused to extradite them; the U.S. would not recognize Gutiérrez's presidency until 3 August.

Aftermath 

Gutiérrez served as president in a provisional capacity until his inauguration on 1 March 1895 after he was elected through a rigged presidential election, in which he was the only candidate, in January of that year. He received 61,080 votes to only 91 against, or 99.85 percent. Prudencio Alfaro was elected as his vice president, winning 38,006 votes, or 62.51 percent. Gutiérrez served until 13 November 1898 when he was overthrown by General Tomás Regalado Romero, who assumed office as provisional president, later legitimizing his rule through the 1899 presidential election. The city of Santa Ana was nicknamed "The Heroic City" by the revolution's leaders after assuming power.

In an interview with The New York Times in July 1894, Carlos stated that he would not seek to regain power. He added, "the revolution was planned by refugee Salvadorans and won with the support of Guatemala". His wife, four children, and three servants joined him in exile. He was accused of bringing USD$3 million with him to the United States, to which he responded, "I wish I had it".

Salvadoran poet and writer Roque Dalton criticized the revolution in his 1972 book Miguel Mármol. Dalton described the rebels as a "reactionary mob" and as "44 rich good-for-nothings and 44 traitors and 44 sons of bitches". He added, "in spite of everything, the Ezeta government was more for the people, while [the government] of the 44 was fundamentally an enemy of the people", citing a period of economic downturn during Gutiérrez's presidency.

See also 

 List of Salvadoran coups d'état

References

Citations

Bibliography

Further reading 

 

Conflicts in 1894
1894 in El Salvador
Salvadoran revolutionaries
History of El Salvador
Wars involving El Salvador